Emmonsaspis is a fossil that was found in the Cambrian-age Parker Slate of Vermont in the late 19th century.

Description 
Emmonsaspis is described as a tadpole or worm-like animal. No trace of a spinal cord is present.

There are two species: Emmonaspis worthanella and Emmonaspis cambriensis (Walcott(?) 1886(?) 1911(?)).

E. cambrensis has been described as a graptolite, a chordate, an arthropod and as a frond-like organism.

Affinities 

It was interpreted by paleontologist C. D. Walcott in 1911 as a polychaete worm. Although some paleontologists regard it as an early chordate allied with Pikaia et al., Conway Morris suggested in 1993 that it might be a Cambrian descendant of the Vendian form Pteridinium, and a frondose morphology is the current vogue.

Notes

Enigmatic prehistoric animal genera
Cambrian animals of North America
Fossil taxa described in 1886